The 2004 Men's Ice Hockey Championships was the 68th such event hosted by the International Ice Hockey Federation. Teams participated at several levels of competition. The competition also served as qualifications for division placements in the 2005 competition.

Championship

Final standings
 
 
 
 
 
 
 
 
 
 
 
 
 
 
  — relegated to Division I for 2005
  — relegated to Division I for 2005

Division I

Group A
Played at Oslo, Norway, April 4–18.

Group B
Played at Gdańsk, Poland, April 12–18.

Division II

Group A
Played at Jaca, Spain, April 12–18.

Group B
Played at Elektrenai, Lithuania, April 12–18.

Division III
Played at Reykjavík, Iceland, March 16–21.

References

External links

 Official site
 IIHF Website
 Complete results at Passionhockey.com
 

World Ice Hockey Championships - Men's
IIHF Men's World Ice Hockey Championships